Prosper may refer to:


Places in the United States 
 Prosper, Minnesota, an unincorporated community
 Prosper, North Dakota, an unincorporated community
 Prosper, Oregon, an unincorporated community
 Prosper, Texas, a town

Other uses
 Prosper (name), a list of people and one fictional character with the given name or surname
 Prosper Marketplace, a business that allows online person-to-person lending and borrowing
 Prosper, the code name of Francis Suttill, a Special Operations Executive agent who headed the anti-Nazi Prosper network in occupied France during WW II. 
 PROSPER, a computer programming language invented by Earl Isaac in the early 1970s